Cocktail sauce, also known as seafood sauce, is one of several types of cold or room temperature sauces often served as part of a dish referred to as a seafood cocktail or as a condiment with other seafoods. The sauce, and the dish for which it is named, are often credited to British celebrity chef Fanny Cradock, but seafood cocktails predate her 1967 recipe by some years (for example, Constance Spry published a seafood cocktail using Dublin Bay Prawns in 1956).

Origin

Seafood cocktails originated in the 19th century in the United States, usually made with oyster or shrimp. Seafood with spiced, cold sauces were a well-established part of the 20th century culinary repertoire. While cocktail sauce is most associated with the prawn cocktail, it can be served with any shellfish.

Varieties

North America
In the United States and Canada it generally consists of, at a minimum, ketchup or chili sauce mixed with prepared horseradish. Lemon juice, Worcestershire sauce and Tabasco sauce are common additives, often all three.

Elsewhere
The common form of cocktail sauce in the United Kingdom, Ireland, Iceland, France, Belgium, Italy and The Netherlands, usually consists of mayonnaise mixed with a tomato sauce to the same pink colour as prawns, producing a result that could be compared to fry sauce. It is similar to Thousand Island dressing, but the more usual British name is Marie (or Mary) Rose Sauce. The origins of the name are unclear and it is variously credited to a 1980s dive team cook working at the site of the Tudor ship, the Mary Rose, and Fanny Cradock. However, the term first appeared in the 1920s as a term for a garnish of shrimp, and was in use for cocktail sauce by at least 1963.  The name was linked to the colour and Escoffier uses it to describe a pink iced pudding. It was so ubiquitous in the 1960s and 1970s that it has since become something of a joke in Britain, along with its most commonly associated dish, the prawn cocktail.

In Belgium, a dash of whisky is often added to the sauce. It is popularly served with steamed shrimp and seafood on the half shell. 

In Australia, it is often provided in fish and chip shops.

In oyster bars
In most American oyster bars, cocktail sauce is the standard accompaniment for raw oysters and patrons at an oyster bar expect to be able to mix their own. The standard ingredients (in roughly decreasing proportion) are ketchup, horseradish, hot sauce (e.g., Tabasco, Louisiana, or Crystal), Worcestershire sauce, and lemon juice. A soufflé cup is usually set in the middle of the platter of oysters along with a cocktail fork and a lemon slice. Often, the bottles of ketchup and other sauces are grouped together in stations every couple of feet along the counter, but in some oyster bars, patrons are served with their own ingredients.

See also

 Court-bouillon
 List of dips
 List of sauces
 Squid cocktail

References

External links

Basic recipe from cdkitchen.com
Recipe from southernfood.about.com
Recipe from recipezaar.com

Sauces